The Crane is a 1992 short film distributed by the British Film Institute.

The movie is set in London. The filming location was the Acton shopping precinct.

The film took place at the 36th London Film Festival in 1992.

Cast
 Jude Law as Young man
 Lee Ross as Burger bar manager
 Melanie Ramsay as Young woman
 Callum Coates as Burger bar skinhead
 Joseph Bennett as Youth in wheelchair
 Isobel Raine as nurse
 Ray Newe as Evangelist skinhead
 David Schofield as Evangelist

External links

 The Crane at British Film Institute site
 , attached by the BFI National Archive, 3 April 2009, accessed 15 April 2009.

References

1992 short films
1992 films
British short films
Films set in London
1990s English-language films